Luis Manuel García Palomera (born 31 December 1992) is a Mexican professional footballer who plays as a goalkeeper for Liga MX club Toluca.

Club career
On 7 July 2017, García signed for Liga MX club Toluca.

External links

1992 births
Living people
Footballers from Jalisco
Association football goalkeepers
Querétaro F.C. footballers
Coras de Nayarit F.C. footballers
Deportivo Toluca F.C. players
Liga MX players
Mexican footballers